Michel Renquin (born 3 November 1955) is a former football player and current coach. He won 55 caps for the Belgium national football team.

He coached mostly in Switzerland.

Playing career
Before 1974: JFC Wibrin
1974–1981: Standard de Liège
1981–1982: R.S.C. Anderlecht
1982–1985: Servette FC
1985–1988: Standard de Liège
1988–1990: FC Sion

Honours

Club 
Standard Liège

 Belgian Cup: 1980–81
 Belgian League Cup: 1975

Servette Genève 

 Swiss Cup: 1983–84
 Swiss Championship: 1984-85

International 
Belgium

 UEFA European Championship: 1980 (runners-up)
 FIFA World Cup: 1986 (fourth place)
 Belgian Sports Merit Award: 1980

References

External links

1955 births
Living people
People from Bastogne
Walloon sportspeople
Belgian footballers
Belgian expatriate footballers
Belgium international footballers
UEFA Euro 1980 players
1982 FIFA World Cup players
1986 FIFA World Cup players
Standard Liège players
R.S.C. Anderlecht players
Servette FC players
FC Sion players
Expatriate footballers in Switzerland
Belgian expatriate sportspeople in Switzerland
Belgian football managers
Belgian Pro League players
Servette FC managers
OGC Nice managers
R.E. Virton managers
C.S. Visé managers
MC Alger managers
Expatriate football managers in Algeria
Footballers from Luxembourg (Belgium)
Association football defenders
Belgian expatriate football managers